Atypoidea is a  clade of mygalomorph spiders, one of the two main groups into which the mygalomorphs are divided (the other being Avicularioidea). It has been treated at the rank of superfamily. It contains five families of spiders:
 Atypidae  ⁠⁠
 Antrodiaetidae  ⁠⁠
 Mecicobothriidae  ⁠⁠
 Hexurellidae  ⁠⁠
 Megahexuridae  ⁠

Spiders from atypoid families live in burrows and use silk to build many different types of burrow entrance constructs, including purse webs, trapdoors, funnel-and-sheet webs, turrets and silken collars.

Phylogeny

The following cladogram illustrates the relationships between atypoid mygalomorph spiders based on the molecular phylogenetic analyses of Hedin et al (2019).

References

Mygalomorphae